Episcia lilacina is a plant species in the family Gesneriaceae that is found from Central America to Colombia.

References

External links 
 
 

lilacina
Plants described in 1865
Flora of Mexico